Keyboardmania (alternately KEYBOARD MANIA, and abbreviated KBM) is a rhythm video game created by the Bemani division of Konami. In this game up to two players use 24-key keyboards to play the piano or keyboard part of a selected song. Notes are represented on-screen by small bars that scroll downward above an image of the keyboard itself. The goal is to play the matching key when a note bar descends to the red play point line. The arcade cabinet has two screens - one for each player.

There is also a simulator called DoReMi Mania, which uses *.pms files. However, players can use a midi-to-pms converter to simplify editing.

Arcade release
Keyboardmania has three Japanese arcade releases: 
Keyboardmania (February 6, 2000)
Keyboardmania 2ndMIX (October 6, 2000)
Keyboardmania 3rdMIX (March 15, 2001)

Super linking session
Keyboardmania 3rdMIX has a linking feature with Drummania 4thMIX/GUITARFREAKS 5thMIX and Drummania 5thMIX/GUITARFREAKS 6thMIX with a dozen songs.

Home version
Keyboardmania has 2 home versions for PlayStation 2:
Keyboardmania (September 21, 2000)
Keyboardmania II (2ndMIX & 3rdMIX) (February 28, 2002)

The home version of the game has modified controller similar to the arcade keys.

One other notable version is for Windows PCs and it is shipped with the Yamaha EZ-250i Keyboard, which is used to play:
Keyboardmania Yamaha Edition (July 23, 2003)

Song lists
The list is incomplete

Keyboardmania
{|class="wikitable"
|-
!Song
!Genre
!Artist
!Video Description
!BPM
!Tier
|-style="background:#66CC99;"
|All the love
|R&B
|LaLa Moore
|Aya, the song character, dances slowly.
|106
|
|-style="background:#66CC99;"
|ARMAJIRO
|Progressive
|Bunmei
|Cybernetic guy exercises with jumping rope, in the middle he trips over and he resumes after his recovery.
|184
|
|-style="background:#66CC99;"
|Brain Child
|Retro Techno
|Logic System
|As the girl watches the television, a gifted boy practices with pulling ups and dish washing. He balances two dishes while walking through the forest and log bridge. A stray dog barks, casing the dishes to fall and break. The boy cries, but suddenly a circus clown arrives with a "New Dish", giving him new pair. It causes him to fly to the sky and to the outer space.
|120
|
|-style="background:#66CC99;"
|BURNIN'
|B3-HARD
|Bunmei, Ryo
|With burning backgrounds and choreography, the solo rocker performs the song with a vacuum cleaner instead of a metal guitar. 
|173
|
|-style="background:#66CC99;"
|Confusion
|Mixed Beat
|Thomas
|
|131
|
|-style="background:#66CC99;"
|CRISIS OF LOVE
|HI-ENERGY
|T.R.S.R. featuring MIHO-F
|
|139
|
|-style="background:#66CC99;"
|Dicky's Theme
|Trenchcoat Jazz
|Naya~n Big Band
|
|160
|
|-style="background:#66CC99;"
|Fairy Tale
|Dream
|Q-mex
|Shining blue flashes, crystal-like patterns and water-like backgrounds.
|140
|
|-style="background:#66CC99;"
|gymnopedie (skip over MIX)
|Sky Walk
|Mitsuto Suzuki
|
|
|Home version of Keyboardmania only
|-style="background:#66CC99;"
|Henry Henry
|Cathedral
|Bunmei
|
|180
|Also in pop'n music 10
|-style="background:#66CC99;"
|Keyboard Man
|A.O.R'N BASS
|simon
|
|165
|
|-style="background:#66CC99;"
|kimi ni ai ni yukou
|HIPHOP
|Pictures of Lily
|
|123
|Unavailable in Keyboardheaven
|-style="background:#66CC99;"
|Let's go back home (for Christmas)
|SWEETLY
|Larry Caorin
|The girl (same character from "Brain Child") drives into the city, and on the highway during sunset.
|138
|
|-style="background:#66CC99;"
|Mighty Guy
|Maximum
|CHIHOMI
|Aya dances rhythmically and lively in the fast-paced background.
|156
|Also in pop'n music 16 PARTY; Unavailable in Keyboardheaven
|-style="background:#66CC99;"
|Mighty Guy -Long Version-
|Maximum
|CHIHOMI
|
|156
|Home version of Keyboardmania only
|-style="background:#66CC99;"
|morning music
|K-CLASSIC
|Bubble System
|Looping warm up sequence for Konami's Bubble System arcade hardware.
|
|
|-style="background:#66CC99;"
|MR. C.C
|DETUNE
|N.R.B
|Keyboardmania's principal character named "Usao-kun", the purple-furred rabbit, walks along the path, ignoring his breakthrough wall. He sleeps on his bed at the end of the video.
|200
|Also in pop'n music 10
|-style="background:#66CC99;"
|My Love
|Love Ballad
|Q-mex & CHELSEA
|Various footage of love-themed videos with on-screen song lyrics. 
|87
|
|-style="background:#66CC99;"
|Pf Concerto NO. 2
|MAESTRO
|Prokochsky
|Usao-kun's majestic conducting performance in fantasy-themed scene.
|180
|
|-style="background:#66CC99;"
|Shake!
|50's
|Bunmei
|A bowling ball player (in paper animation) shakes by beat along with his back-up dancers on bowling center.
|175
|Also in pop'n music 9
|-style="background:#66CC99;"
|Shining Dream
|STYLISH
|Magic project
|Flashy lights, zooming seascape and skies.
|155
|Unavailable in Keyboardheaven|-style="background:#66CC99;"
|しりとり (Shiritori)
|STRAIGHT
|Fantastic Factory
|
|187
|Also in GUITARFREAKS 5thMIX & drummania 4thMIX and Pop'n music 8; Unavailable in Keyboardheaven|-style="background:#66CC99;"
|The 24th D
|Goa Trance
|SPARKER
|
|145
|
|-style="background:#66CC99;"
|TRUTH
|Fusion
|
|
|
|Home version of Keyboardmania only
|}

Keyboardmania 2ndMix

Keyboardmania 3rdMix

Notable songs
These songs were later featured in Dance Dance Revolution Extreme and every subsequent Dance Dance Revolution arcade release, excluding Dancing Stage Fusion:
Frozen Ray - also in Beatmania IIDX 6th StylePink Rose - also in Pop'n music 5 (for the Japanese PlayStation) and Beatmania IIDX 12.HAPPY SKYThe Least 100sec - one of the dozen songs that can be played in the Super linking Session. This song also appears in Pop'n music and the Beatmania series, including III and IIDX''.

Trivia
 Since there are 24 keys, the range is C3-B4.

External links
keyboardmania Official homepage in Japanese
keyboardmania 3rdMIX Official homepage in Japanese
keyboardmania 2ndMIX Official homepage in Japanese
Bemanistyle in English
keyboardmania Hong Kong FanClub in Chinese

References

2000 video games
Arcade video games
Bemani games
Konami franchises
Keyboard video games
Japan-exclusive video games
PlayStation 2 games
Video games developed in Japan